George William Andrews (December 12, 1906 – December 25, 1971) was an American politician and a U.S. Representative from Alabama, and the husband of Elizabeth B. Andrews.

Andrews is known for objecting to the Supreme Court decision banning school prayer by saying, "They put the Negroes in the schools and now they've driven God out."

Biography
Andrews was born in Clayton, Alabama son of George William and Addie Bell (King) Andrews. He attended the public schools, and graduated from the University of Alabama at Tuscaloosa in 1928. He was admitted to the bar in 1928 and commenced practice in Union Springs, Alabama. On November 25, 1936, he married Leslie Elizabeth Bullock.

Career
He served as district attorney for the third judicial circuit of Alabama, from 1931 to 1943. During the Second World War, he served as a lieutenant (jg.) in the United States Naval Reserve from January 1943 until his election to Congress, at which time he was serving at Pearl Harbor, Hawaii.

Andrews was elected as a Democrat to the Seventy-eighth Congress to fill the vacancy caused by the death of Henry B. Steagall. He was reelected to the fourteen succeeding Congresses and served from March 14, 1944, until his death from complications following heart surgery in Birmingham, Alabama on December 25, 1971. In 1957, he voted against H.R. 6127, Civil Rights Act of 1957. He was a signatory to the 1956 Southern Manifesto that opposed the desegregation of public schools ordered by the Supreme Court in Brown v. Board of Education.

Death and legacy
Andrews died in Birmingham, Alabama on December 25, 1971, 13 days after turning 65. He is interred at Oak Hill Cemetery, Union Springs, Alabama.  The George W. Andrews Lake and George W. Andrews Federal Building are named for him.

See also
 List of United States Congress members who died in office (1950–99)

References

External links

1906 births
1971 deaths
20th-century American politicians
American segregationists
People from Clayton, Alabama
United States Navy officers
United States Navy personnel of World War II
Democratic Party members of the United States House of Representatives from Alabama